Jacareí is a city in the state of São Paulo, Brazil.  The population is 235,416 (2020 est.) in an area of 464.27 km2. The city is known as "Capital of Beer" by the daily output of its factories, considered the biggest in Latin America. The economic activity is mainly based on industrial production. The industries produce mainly paper, chemicals, glass, wire, and rubber.

Location

Jacareí is part of the Metropolitan Region of Vale do Paraíba e Litoral Norte.
The city is located in the Paraíba do Sul's valley (the Paraíba do Sul is the most important river in the east of the state). This region is highly industrialized, located between the cities of São Paulo and Rio de Janeiro.

The municipality contains part of the  Mananciais do Rio Paraíba do Sul Environmental Protection Area, created in 1982 to protect the sources of the Paraíba do Sul river.

Neighbor  Cities: São José dos Campos, Santa Branca, Guararema, Jambeiro, Igaratá and Santa Isabel.

History

Jacareí was formed on land that belonged to Mogi das Cruzes. It was founded by Antonio Afonso and his sons in 1652. They built a chapel in honor of Our Lady of Conception. With the help of peaceful Indians, the village prospered. In 1953, was elevated as a town and in 1849, as a city.
Paraibuna (on December 7, 1812), Santa Branca (on February 20, 1841) and São José dos Campos (unknown date) were incorporated into the municipality of Jacareí. They were later dismembered: Sao José do Campos in 1767, Paraibuna in 1832 and Santa Branca in 1856.
With the coffee cycle, the city begins to have paving, new roads and leisure activities, with a small population growth. It was one of the most important cities of the coffee cycle.  At this time (late nineteenth century), industries were beginning to emerge, starting with the socks and the factory "Biscoutos Jacareí" (Jacareí's cookies), taking a leap of development in the twentieth century.

Etimology
  
The origin of the name Jacareí is not known but there are two hypotheses.

Contains in the archives of the municipality that, in the past, the lakes and the Paraiba do Sul river relied on large numbers of alligators. In a fraternization, held on the river bank near the pond, a component of the group who was having fun next to the river, watching the large number of alligators made an observation: "Jacaré, iih" (alligator, iih). It was the simple interjection that, connected to the alligator, resulted in Jacareí.

The second hypothesis is that the word came from a native Brazilian language (Tupi language) "Icare-ig" that means "river of alligators".

Demography

Census of 2009

Total Population: 212,824

Urban: 183,377
Rural: 7,914
Men: 94 634
Women: 96,657
Population density (inhabitants / Km ²): 415.85

Infant mortality up to 1 year (per thousand): 16.67

Life expectancy (years): 70.80

Fertility rate (children per woman): 2.19

Literacy rate: 93.97%

Human Development Index (HDI): 0.809
Income HDI: 0.752
Longevity HDI: 0.763
Education HDI: 0.913

Authorship: IPEADATA

Sister Cities
  Cluj-Napoca, Romania
  Kawagoe, Japan

References

External links
Jacareí City Administration
Page About Jacareí City